The Boxtrolls is a 2014 American stop-motion animated fantasy comedy film directed by Graham Annable and Anthony Stacchi (in their feature directorial debuts) loosely based on the 2005 novel Here Be Monsters! by Alan Snow. It is produced by Laika. Set in the fictional European country of Norvenia in the late-19th century, the film tells the story of Eggs, a human boy raised by trash-collecting trolls, known as "Boxtrolls", as he attempts to save them from Archibald Snatcher, a pest exterminator. This film was the animated film debut of Isaac Hempstead-Wright, who voices Eggs, the main protagonist and features the voices of Ben Kingsley, Elle Fanning, Dee Bradley Baker, Steve Blum, Toni Collette, Jared Harris, Nick Frost, Richard Ayoade, Tracy Morgan, and Simon Pegg.

Laika unveiled a slate of projects in development, among which was also an animated feature film adaptation of the Alan Snow novel Here Be Monsters! in June 2008. While the animation technique wasn't yet decided upon, Stacchi was set to direct the film. On February 7, 2013, Laika announced that it would be released in October 2014, which later changed to September 2014 in May 2013. Originally focused on all five species of creatures found in the original book, Knight noted that the script ultimately was hollow with all the monsters, that it didn't really have anything to say. As the result, the team ended up focusing on the Boxtrolls as Knight thought there was something that was really compelling about that group of characters. Dario Marianelli composed the film's musical score.

The film was released in the United States on September 26, 2014, by Focus Features, and received generally positive reviews from critics. It earned $108 million on a $60 million budget. It was nominated for an Academy Award for Best Animated Feature, a Golden Globe Award for Best Animated Feature Film and a BAFTA Award for Best Animated Film, but lost to Big Hero 6, How to Train Your Dragon 2 and The LEGO Movie, respectively.

Plot
In the summer of 1896, in the hill-top Victorian era town of Cheesebridge, Norvenia, rumors abound that subterranean trolls (known as Boxtrolls for the cardboard boxes they wear) have kidnapped a baby. Pest exterminator Archibald Snatcher strikes a deal with the city's leader Lord Portley-Rind to exterminate every Boxtroll in exchange for membership in the city's cheese-loving council called the White Hats, despite the fact that he himself is severely allergic to cheese.

In actuality, the Boxtrolls are peaceful and emerge from underground at night to scavenge for discarded items with which to make useful inventions. A human boy named Eggs lives among them, cared for by a Boxtroll named Fish. As Eggs grows up, he becomes dismayed by the disappearing Boxtrolls, such as Wheels and Oil Can, seized by Snatcher. After Lord Portley-Rind's daughter Winnie sees Eggs with two Boxtrolls, Snatcher captures Fish. Eggs sneaks to the surface to find Fish and emerges in an annual fair to commemorate the disappearance of the "Trubshaw Baby" who was allegedly killed by Boxtrolls.

Disgusted by the town's inaccurate portrayal of the creatures, Eggs follows Winnie. After a brief exchange, he asks her for directions to Snatcher's headquarters, located at an abandoned factory, where Eggs rescues Fish. They are caught in the escape. Snatcher recognizes Eggs as the Trubshaw Baby and reveals that all the captured Boxtrolls are building him a machine. Winnie, who covertly followed Eggs, overhears this exchange. She then helps Fish and Eggs escape from Snatcher and they take shelter in the Boxtrolls' caves, where Fish explains that Eggs' father had given him to them to protect him from Snatcher. Winnie agrees to help Eggs tell Portley-Rind the truth.

At a ball held to commemorate the purchase of a giant cheese wheel called the Briehemoth, which was foolishly made using the funds for a children's hospital, Eggs tries to confront Portley-Rind, but is confronted by Snatcher (disguised as a woman named "Madame Frou-Frou"). Whilst trying to avoid Snatcher, Eggs inadvertently knocks the cheese wheel into a river. Eggs announces himself to the party as the Trubshaw Baby, but no one believes him, including Portley-Rind, who is too upset about losing the cheese wheel.

Eggs tries to persuade the remaining Boxtrolls to flee for their own safety, but unknowingly demoralises them. Snatcher digs into the caves and captures them all. Eggs awakens to find his father Herbert Trubshaw a prisoner beside him. He sees the Boxtrolls stacked in a crusher and begs them to leave their boxes and run, but they are seemingly killed by the crusher.

Snatcher drives his machine to Lord Portley-Rind's house, shows him the flattened boxes as proof of the Boxtrolls' extinction, and demands Portley-Rind's white hat in exchange for killing the last Boxtroll, which is actually Eggs disguised. The Boxtrolls, who have escaped from the crusher, free Eggs while Herbert reveals himself, causing Portley-Rind and the citizens to realize that Snatcher lied to them. With his plot exposed, Snatcher tries to take Portley-Rind's hat by force; two of his henchmen, Mr. Trout and Mr. Pickles, turn against him and help the Boxtrolls disable the machine, which falls on Snatcher's right-hand man Mr. Gristle and crushes him to death. Eggs and Snatcher are thrown clear and land on the recovered Briehemoth, which triggers Snatcher's cheese allergy and causes him to swell to a grotesque size. He seizes Winnie and forces Lord Portley-Rind to give up his hat in exchange for her safety, but after tasting an aged cheese sample, his cheese allergy finally sets off and he explodes into pieces, killing him.

With Snatcher's plot foiled, the townspeople and Boxtrolls agree to form a peaceful coexistence with each other. Winnie tells the tale of Snatcher's end to a crowd while Fish, Eggs and Herbert drive off in one of Herbert's contraptions.

Voice cast

 Isaac Hempstead Wright as Eggs, an orphaned 11-year-old human boy raised by the Boxtrolls, the adoptive son of Fish.
 Max Mitchell as Baby Eggs
 Ben Kingsley as Archibald Snatcher, a ruthless, arrogant, antagonistic and cunning pest exterminator who also cross-dresses as Madame Frou-Frou.
 Elle Fanning as Winifred "Winnie" Portley-Rind, Eggs's first human friend and the 10-year-old daughter of Lord and Lady Portley-Rind.
 Dee Bradley Baker as Fish, Wheels, and Bucket, three Boxtrolls. Fish is the gentle, but skittish adoptive father of Eggs.
 Steve Blum as Shoe and Sparky, two Boxtrolls.
 Toni Collette as Lady Cynthia Portley-Rind, Winnie's mother and Lord Portley-Rind's snobbish wife.
 Jared Harris as Lord Charles Portley-Rind, Winnie's father, the cheese-obsessed leader of the White Hats, and the leader of Cheesebridge.
 Nick Frost as Mr. Trout, Snatcher's corpulent, bumbling, yet intellectual employee.
 Richard Ayoade as Mr. Pickles, Snatcher's tall, spindly, well-meaning but misguided employee.
 Tracy Morgan as Mr. Gristle, Snatcher's diminutive and maniacal second-in-command and best friend.
 Simon Pegg as Herbert Trubshaw, an inventor and Eggs's biological father.

Production

In June 2008, Laika unveiled a slate of projects in development, among which was also an animated feature film adaptation of the Alan Snow novel Here Be Monsters!, eventually to become The Boxtrolls. The animation technique wasn't yet decided upon, but Anthony Stacchi was set to direct the film. Laika announced on February 7, 2013, that the adaptation would be their next 3D stop motion feature, under the title The Boxtrolls. Directed by Stacchi and Graham Annable, Laika CEO Travis Knight noted that the biggest challenge of the film was to condense a 550-page novel down to a 90-minute film. Initially the film focused on all five species of creatures found in the original book, but Knight noted that the script "ultimately was hollow" with all the monsters, and that "it didn't really have anything to say." The team ended up focusing on the Boxtrolls as Knight thought "there was something that was really compelling about that group of characters".

On February 7, 2013, Focus Features originally set the film for an October 17, 2014, release, In May 2013, the release date was changed to September 26, 2014. Focus Features holds worldwide distribution rights to The Boxtrolls, and Universal Pictures International released the movie overseas (with eOne Distribution handling Canada).

Release
On June 11, 2014, two new trailers, one for the US and one for the UK, were released by the studio. The film premiered at the Venice Film Festival on August 31, 2014.

Home media
The Boxtrolls was released on DVD and Blu-ray 3D on January 20, 2015, by Universal Pictures Home Entertainment, a new edition from Shout! Factory under license from Universal was released on August 31, 2021.

Other media
A game named The Boxtrolls: Slide N' Sneak was made for iOS.

Music

On December 4, 2013, composer Dario Marianelli was hired to score The Boxtrolls, the first animated feature film of his career. On August 30, 2014, it was announced that WaterTower Music would release a soundtrack album for the film on September 23, 2014.

Track listing

Reception

Box office
The Boxtrolls grossed $50.8 million in North America and $57.4 million in other territories, for a worldwide total of $108.2 million, against a budget of $60 million.

In the United States and Canada, it earned $17.2 million in its opening weekend from 3,464 theaters, debuting at number three at the box office behind The Equalizer and The Maze Runner. It had a strong 3.5x weekend multiplier off its $4.9 million opening day, which is more front-loaded than Coraline (3.8x) but played much less front-loaded than ParaNorman (3.11x). It set the record for the biggest opening weekend for Laika surpassing 2009's Coraline ($16.8 million), and the second-biggest for a stop-motion animation film behind Laika's 2005 co-production, Corpse Bride ($19.1 million).

In other territories, The Boxtrolls earned $5.1 million from 1,806 screens in 16 countries in its opening weekend. In terms of total earnings, its largest markets are the United Kingdom and Ireland ($13.8 million), Australia ($5.8 million), and Mexico ($5 million). It is Laika's highest-grossing film overseas, surpassing ParaNormans $51.1 million.

Critical response
On review aggregator Rotten Tomatoes, the film holds an approval rating of 78% based on 176 reviews, with an average rating of 7.10/10. The site's critical consensus states: "While it's far from Laika's best offering, The Boxtrolls is still packed with enough offbeat wit and visual splendor to offer a healthy dose of all-ages entertainment." On Metacritic, the film has a weighted average score of 61 out of 100 based on 37 critics, indicating "generally favorable reviews". Audiences polled by CinemaScore gave the film an average grade of "B+" on an A+ to F scale, while PostTrak reported filmgoers gave it a 77% overall positive score and a 61% "definite recommend".

Tom Huddleston of Time Out gave the film three out of five stars, saying "Breathlessly paced and surreally funny, The Boxtrolls fizzes with visual invention and wild slapstick. But the grotesquerie is overbearing." Alonso Duralde of The Wrap gave the film a negative review, saying "A surprisingly charmless and aimless movie from Laika Studios, who previously crafted the wonderfully dark Coraline and ParaNorman, this latest venture seems destined to disturb young viewers while thoroughly boring their parents." Amy Nicholson of LA Weekly gave the film a B+, saying "The Boxtrolls is a kiddie charmer that makes you laugh, cower and think of Hitler. That's an unusual trifecta, but then again, this is an unusual film." James Rocchi of Film.com gave the film a 5.8 out of 10, saying "The Boxtrolls is a swing-and-miss for Laika; when you move forward with revolutionary techniques while standing still in terms of your themes, stories and settings, no amount of technical trickery or animation genius can bring the boring to vivid life." Jake Coyle of the Associated Press gave the film a positive review, saying "The Boxtrolls, despite a rather uncertainly structured story by screenwriters Irena Brignull and Adam Pava, has its pleasantly demented charms." Kyle Smith of the New York Post gave the film two out of four stars, saying "Engaging as it is to look at, this stop-motion animation film from the young Oregon studio Laika seems to have been masterminded by people thinking, "Everyone loves Pixar. So let's do everything the opposite!""

A. A. Dowd of The A.V. Club gave the film a B+, saying "In an age when most cartoon companies have traded pens for pixels, the magicians at Laika continue to create fantastically elaborate universes out of pure elbow grease." John Hartl of The Seattle Times gave the film three out of four stars, saying "Visually the film is a feast, stuffed with little jokes and surprises and the kind of black humor that Alfred Hitchcock heartily enjoyed." Brian Truitt of USA Today gave the film three out of four stars, saying "A delectable treat that balances themes of identity and class warfare with Monty Python-style political skewering, quirky humor and dairy jokes." Mick LaSalle of the San Francisco Chronicle gave the film two out of four stars, saying "One gets the sense that directors Anthony Stacchi and Graham Annable have their hearts in the action sequences and not in the characters, and that's a problem." Michael Phillips of the Chicago Tribune gave the film two out of four stars, saying "The Boxtrolls remains relentlessly busy up through its final credits, and it's clever in a nattering way. But it's virtually charmless." Michael O'Sullivan of The Washington Post gave the film three out of four stars, saying "The story of The Boxtrolls, in lesser hands, might have turned out only so-so. Under Laika's loving, labor-intensive touch, it takes on a kind of magic." Richard Corliss of Time gave the film a positive review, saying "The Boxtrolls has its penny-dreadful moments, but it's mostly a larkish stroll through a cemetery where the monsters are the good guys."

Ethan Gilsdorf of The Boston Globe gave the film a positive review, saying "Like one of its wondrously designed steampunky contraptions, The Boxtrolls is a marvelous thing to behold, and watch spin, even if it doesn't go anywhere terribly interesting." Bruce Demara of the Toronto Star gave the film three and a half stars out of four, saying "From Laika, the animation studio that brought you such memorably quirky classics as Coraline and ParaNorman comes another totally offbeat and original tale for kids (and adults) looking for something a little more challenging and completely off the wall." Rafer Guzman of Newsday gave the film two-and-a-half stars out of four, saying "The Boxtrolls has moments of humor and imagination, but American children may not be its ideal audience." A. O. Scott of The New York Times gave the film a positive review, saying "In The Boxtrolls, old-fashioned stop-motion animation is combined with new-style 3-D cinematography to charming effect." David Rooney of The Hollywood Reporter gave the film a mixed review, saying "There's a crucial shortage of heart here, from the messy storytelling to the hit-or-miss humor and unattractive visuals." Steve Persall of the Tampa Bay Times gave the film a D, saying "The Boxtrolls is a visually repellent pile of stop-motion animation, populated by grotesques and filmed in the palette of an exhumed casket's interior. It can frighten small children and bore anyone, with its cracked, cackled British wit." Joe Neumaier of the New York Daily News gave the film two out of five stars, saying "Kids who get a kick out of the macabre will enjoy this exquisitely crafted but tedious film."

Accolades
{| class="wikitable plainrowheaders"
|+ <span style="font-size: 9pt">List of Awards and Nominations</span>
|-
! scope="col" style="width:4%;"| Year
! scope="col" style="width:25%;"| Award
! scope="col" style="width:33%;"| Category
! scope="col" style="width:33%;"| Recipients
! scope="col" style="width:5%;"| Results
|-
! scope="row" rowspan="15" style="text-align:center;"| 2014
| San Francisco Film Critics Circle Award
|colspan=2|Best Animated Feature
| 
|-
| scope="row" rowspan="13" | 42nd Annual Annie Awards
|colspan=2|Best Animated Feature 
| 
|-
| Animated Effects in an Animated Production
| Rick Sevy, Peter Vickery, Kent Estep, Peter Stuart, Ralph Procida
| 
|-
| rowspan="3"|Character Animation in a Feature Production
| Travis Knight
| 
|-
| Malcolm Lamont
| 
|-
| Jason Stalman
| 
|-
| Character Design in an Animated Feature Production
| Mike Smith
| 
|-
| Directing in an Animated Feature Production
| Anthony Stacchi & Graham Annable 
| 
|-
| Production Design in an Animated Feature Production
| Paul Lasaine, Tom McClure & August Hall 
| 
|-
| rowspan="2"| Storyboarding in an Animated Feature Production
| Julian Narino
| 
|-
| Emanuela Cozzi
| 
|-
| rowspan="2"|Voice Acting in a Feature Production
| Sir Ben Kingsley (as Archibald Snatcher)
| 
|-
| Dee Bradley Baker (as Fish)
| 
|-
| Writing in an Animated Feature Production
| Irena Brignull & Adam Pava
| 
|-
| 72nd Golden Globe Awards
| colspan=2|Best Animated Feature
| 
|-
! scope="row" rowspan="9" style="text-align:center;"| 2015
| Academy Awards
| colspan=2|Best Animated Feature
| 
|-
| Critics' Choice Awards
| colspan=2|Best Animated Feature
| 
|-
| Producers Guild of America
| Best Outstanding Producer of Animated Theatrical Motion Pictures
| David Bleiman Ichioka and Travis Knight
| 
|-
| Saturn Awards
| colspan=2|Best Animated Film
| 
|-
| rowspan="5"|13th Visual Effects Society Awards
| Outstanding Animation in an Animated Feature Motion Picture
| Travis Knight, Anthony Stacchi, Graham Annable, Brad Schiff
| 
|-
| Outstanding Animated Character in an Animated Feature Motion Picture
| Travis Knight, Jason Stalman, Michael Laubach, Kyle Williams for "Archibald Snatcher"
| 
|-
| Outstanding Created Environment in an Animated Feature Motion Picture
| Curt Enderle, Rob DeSue, Emily Greene, Jesse Gregg for "Boxtroll Cavern"
| 
|-
| Outstanding Models in any Motion Media Project
| Tom McClure, Oliver Jones, Raul Martinez for "Mecha-Drill"
| 
|-
| Outstanding Effects Simulations in an Animated Feature Motion Picture
| Kent Estep, Peter Stuart, Ralph Procida, Timur Khodzhaev
| 
|}

See alsoHere Be Monsters!''
List of American films of 2014

References

External links

 
  at Focus Features
 
 

2014 films
2014 3D films
2014 animated films
2010s adventure films
2010s American animated films
2010s fantasy comedy films
American 3D films
American adventure comedy films
American children's animated adventure films
American children's animated comedy films
American children's animated fantasy films
American fantasy adventure films
American fantasy comedy films
Animated adventure films
Animated films about orphans
Annie Award winners
Focus Features films
Focus Features animated films
Films scored by Dario Marianelli
Films about trolls
Films based on British novels
Films scored by Mark Orton
Films set in Europe
Films set in a fictional country
Films set in the 19th century
Films set in the Victorian era
Films shot in Portland, Oregon
Laika (company) animated films
2010s stop-motion animated films
2010s monster movies
2014 comedy films
2014 directorial debut films
American animated feature films
2010s English-language films